Kotzen is a municipality in the Havelland district, in Brandenburg, Germany.

Demography

Translation
Since one English translation of the German verb "" is "to vomit", the town was jokingly incorrectly referred to in Ripley's Believe-It-or-Not under the title "Barfburg". More prosaically the name probably comes from the Slavonic-German noun "Kotzen" which means market place, as per the Theater an der Kotzen, Divadlo v Kotcích in Prague.

Personalities
Explorer Karl Klaus von der Decken was born in Kotzen in 1833.

References

External links

Localities in Havelland